Senator McMillan may refer to:

Members of the United States Senate
James McMillan (politician) (1838–1902), U.S. Senator from Michigan from 1889 to 1902
Samuel J. R. McMillan (1826–1897), U.S. Senator from Minnesota from 1875 to 1887

United States state senate members
Alexander McMillan (North Carolina politician) (died 1817), North Carolina State Senate
George McMillan (politician) (born 1943), Alabama State Senate
Kenneth G. McMillan (born 1942), Illinois State Senate

See also
William L. McMillen (1829–1902), Louisiana State Senate; also elected to the U.S. Senate, but not admitted
Senator McMullen (disambiguation)